The U Sports women's soccer championship is a tournament which involves the champions from each of the four regional sports conferences within Canada's university sports governing body of U Sports. The championship features eight teams in single elimination matches to determine a national champion. The championship hosts 11 games over four days at a predetermined host venue. The host team is automatically qualified for the tournament, as is each of the conference champions, with additional berths awarded for the remaining spots. The Gladys Bean Memorial Trophy is awarded to the winners.

The 2020 championship tournament was cancelled due to the COVID-19 pandemic.

Champions

Honours

U Sports Championship MVP
The selection is made by a committee established by the host of the U Sports championship.
2021 Samantha Gouveia, MacEwan
2019 Danielle Steer, UBC
2018 Miranda Smith, Ottawa
2017 Marie-Ève Bernard O'Breham, Montreal
2016 Joëlle Gosselin, Laval
2015 Jasmin Dhanda, UBC
2014 Joëlle Gosselin, Laval
2013 Vanessa Kovacs, Trinity Western
2012 Jennifer Castillo, Trinity Western
2011 Chantel Marson, Queen's University
2010 Kelsey Tikka, Laurier
2009 Tessa Meyer, Trinity Western
2008 Daniela Gerig, Trinity Western
2007 Kylie Snow, Cape Breton
2006 Amy Bobb, UBC
2005 Carey Gustafson, Victoria
2004 Danielle Day, McGill
2003 Rosalyn Hicks, UBC
2002 Sarah Regan, UBC
2001 Aishatu Alfa, Alberta
2000 Claire Martin, Dalhousie
1999 Stef Finateri, Dalhousie
1998 Stephanie O'Neill, Calgary
1997 Heather Murray, Alberta
1996 Danielle Vella, Ottawa
1995 Camilla Vejvalka, Laurier
1994 Carla Perry, Dalhousie
1993 Tammy Crawford, UBC
1992 Nancy Ferguson, UBC
1991 Lydia Vamos, McMaster
1990 Alison Tuton, Acadia
1989 Jane Wood, Alberta

References

External links 
Bob Adams CIS Sports Page
U Sports Women's Soccer

University and college soccer in Canada competitions
Women's soccer competitions in Canada
U Sports soccer
U Sports trophies